Yossi Shai Benayoun (born 5 May 1980) is an Israeli former professional footballer who played as a midfielder. He spent most of his career in England and captained the Israel national team. Born in Dimona, he is sometimes nicknamed "The Diamond from Dimona" in Israel.

Benayoun played for Hapoel Be'er Sheva and Maccabi Haifa before moving to Racing de Santander in Spain. Three years later he moved to the Premier League with West Ham United, and later Liverpool. In 2010, he signed for Chelsea, where he was used rarely, being loaned to Arsenal and back to West Ham, but nonetheless won the 2012–13 UEFA Europa League. After that, he was released by the club and spent a season in the Football League Championship with Queens Park Rangers before returning to Maccabi Haifa.

A full international for twenty years from 1998 to 2018, Benayoun is Israel's most capped player of all time with 102 caps, and their joint third top scorer with 24 international goals.

Benayoun holds the position of sporting director for Beitar Jerusalem the club that he last played for.

Early life
Benayoun was born in Dimona, Israel, to a family of Sephardic Jewish (Moroccan-Jewish) descent. His father Dudu Benayoun was a footballer who played for Hapoel Dimona as well.

Youth career
Jason Burt of The Independent reports that Benayoun's talent was spotted at the age of nine. At the age of 11 he was labelled a genius, and by 13, his face appeared on the cover of Israeli magazines. Benayoun began to play with Hapoel Be'er Sheva. To attend training, he hitchhiked the 60 km roundtrip with his father.

When he was 15, Ajax invited Benayoun and his family to the Netherlands. By his 16th birthday, he was the Ajax youth team's highest scorer and best player, and Ajax duly offered Benayoun a four-year professional contract. However, Benayoun and his family found the adjustment to Amsterdam difficult, and they returned to Israel after eight months.

Club career

Hapoel Be'er Sheva
At the age of 16, he was promoted to the Hapoel Be'er Sheva senior team for the 1997–98 Liga Leumit, but could not prevent the club from being relegated to Israel's second division. In the last match of the season against Maccabi Haifa, Benayoun got a penalty kick in the 90th minute. Haifa's goalkeeper, Nir Davidovich, saved the shot but Benayoun scored the rebound to give his team the win. However, their relegation rival had won their match, meaning that his team would be relegated nonetheless. Seconds after scoring, while celebrating the winning and what he thought to be a league survival goal, Benayoun found out about the relegation and burst into tears. Benayoun finished as the league's joint fourth-leading goalscorer that season, with 15 goals in 25 appearances.

Maccabi Haifa
After that season, Benayoun moved to Maccabi Haifa in a deal signed by Ya'akov Shahar (Maccabi Haifa's president) and Eli Zino (the former Be'er Sheva president), and it was agreed that the two clubs would share the profits from selling Benayoun to a European club.

In 1998, under the guidance of Dusan Uhrin and Daniel Brailovsky, Benayoun and Haifa reached the quarterfinals of the Cup Winners' Cup, and he scored a late equaliser against Paris Saint-Germain and also against SV Ried in a 4–1 victory.

Benayoun also scored 16 goals in 29 matches for Haifa in the 1998–99 Liga Leumit, finishing the season as the equal eighth leading goalscorer for his team.

In 1999, he confronted his manager Eli Cohen, when Benayoun allegedly refused to be substituted during a match. This incident, plus a bad month for the club, ultimately caused Cohen's resignation. In the 1999–2000, the maiden season of the newly formed Israeli Premier League, Benayoun scored 19 goals in 38 matches for Maccabi Haifa, and was the league's third highest goalscorer.

In the 2000–01 season under the guidance of Avram Grant, Benayoun led Haifa to a first championship after seven years and was chosen as the Most Valuable Player of the season, after amassing 13 goals in 37 matches. Another successful season placed him as the league's equal sixth highest goalscorer.

The next season, Benayoun helped Maccabi Haifa win another championship, despite suffering from an injury at the beginning of the season. When he returned to play, he combined well with Đovani Roso, Raimondas Žutautas, and Yakubu to win the championship. In his last season with Maccabi Haifa, Benayoun scored 7 times in 33 matches.

Benayoun made 130 appearances for Haifa, scoring 55 goals.

Racing de Santander
In 2002, Benayoun moved to Racing de Santander in Spain's La Liga, scoring five goals in 31 matches his first season (2002–03 La Liga), seven goals in 35 matches his second (2003–04 La Liga), and nine goals in 35 matches his third (2004–05 La Liga), the latter including a hat-trick against Deportivo La Coruña in a 4–1 away victory.

In total, he made 101 appearances for Racing, scoring 21 goals.

Santander opted to cash in on Benayoun by selling him to his agents Pini Zahavi and Ronen Katsav for €3.5 million. Benayoun rejected a €5 million move to CSKA Moscow, preferring a move to England or to remain in Spain. This sparked a great deal of interest in the player with Newcastle United, Tottenham Hotspur, Liverpool, Bolton Wanderers, Real Sociedad, and Deportivo La Coruña seen as likely suitors.

West Ham United
Newly promoted FA Premier League team West Ham United completed the signing of Benayoun in July 2005 for a fee of £2.5 million, with Benayoun signing a four-year contract. Manager Alan Pardew hailed the signing citing Benayoun's ability to 'open the door when teams sit deep' while Benayoun revealed his excitement at the opportunity to play for West Ham and in the Premiership.

He made his Premiership debut for West Ham on the opening day of the 2005–06 season (13 August 2005 against Blackburn Rovers) in West Ham's 3–1 win. He went on to score his first Premiership goal for the club when he netted the closing goal in a 4–0 home victory over Aston Villa on 12 September 2005.

In May 2006, Benayoun played in the 2006 FA Cup Final for West Ham against Liverpool in Cardiff, West Ham losing on penalties after a 3–3 draw. Benayoun scored five times in 34 league matches in his first season at West Ham and three goals in 29 appearances his second season. His last game for West Ham was a 1–0 victory against Manchester United at Old Trafford on 13 May 2007, a game in which West Ham avoided relegation following a single goal from Carlos Tevez.

Liverpool

Benayoun moved to Liverpool under controversial circumstances. He had verbally agreed on a new four-year deal with West Ham in May 2007, only to go back on the agreement in a bid to move to Liverpool. The controversy was heightened on 10 July when the Israeli media reported that Benayoun's agent, Ronen Katsav, had agreed a deal with Liverpool which would mean Benayoun taking a lower pay than the £50,000 a week offered by West Ham in May. On 12 July, Liverpool reported on their official website that the signing of Benayoun had been completed a £5 million deal with him signing a four-year contract.

Benayoun was introduced as a Liverpool player along with Ryan Babel on 13 July, and was given the number 11 shirt. He made his first competitive start for Liverpool against Toulouse in the first leg of the third qualification round for the UEFA Champions League. His first goal for Liverpool came on 25 September 2007 when he scored against Reading in the League Cup with a wonderful solo effort. Benayoun scored a second hat-trick against a mismatched opponent in his first season against non-league side Havant & Waterlooville in the FA Cup, a team 122 places behind Liverpool on the league pyramid. On 7 November 2007, in a UEFA Champions League home game against Beşiktaş in the Group Stage, Benayoun scored a hat trick in Liverpool's 8–0 win against the Istanbul team. Benayoun ended a successful first season having played 48 games scoring 11 goals in the process, including four league goals against Wigan Athletic, Portsmouth, Aston Villa, and Birmingham City.

Benayoun's performance was not enough to prevent transfer rumours in the summer of 2008. This led to the Israeli openly announcing his intention to stay, saying: "Liverpool is good for me and it was always clear I want to stay and Liverpool wants me," He was given his preferred number 15 shirt (which was occupied by Peter Crouch during the 2007–08 season but was vacated when he moved to Portsmouth) for the 2008–09 season. Benayoun had worn the number 11 during his first season at the club, but switched to his favourite number 15, the number he wore for Hapoel Be'er Sheva, Maccabi Haifa, Racing de Santander, West Ham United and Israel.

On 6 December 2008, Benayoun scored his first goal of the 2008–09 season in Liverpool's 3–1 victory over Blackburn.

On 25 February 2009, Benayoun scored a header from Fábio Aurélio's free-kick in the 82nd minute against Real Madrid at the Santiago Bernabéu in the UEFA Champions League Round of 16 to give Liverpool a 1–0 win.

Again on 4 April 2009, Benayoun came on as a substitute in Liverpool's match against Fulham to score a dramatic winner in the 94th minute. On 21 April 2009, in a home match against Arsenal, he scored a diving header and volleyed a late equaliser in injury time to level the scores at 4–4.

Benayoun finished his second season at Anfield in spectacular fashion; scoring a goal in each of Liverpool's last three home matches. In the 2008–09 season, Benayoun played in 39 matches, scoring 9 goals, including eight league goals against Wigan, Blackburn, Newcastle, Sunderland, Fulham, Tottenham Hotspur and a brace against Arsenal. He established a regular starting position in the Liverpool team in the second half of the season.

On 6 July 2009, he signed a two-year contract extension tying him to the club until 2013.

On 12 September 2009, he scored his first Premier League hat-trick for Liverpool in a 4–0 win against Burnley. He was the first player to score Premiership, Champions League and FA Cup hat tricks, but has since been joined by Sergio Aguero and Harry Kane. He scored the first goal in Liverpool's 3–0 win over West Ham.

Benayoun's last goal for the club came in the 2009–10 UEFA Europa League semi-final against Atlético Madrid. Benayoun scored in extra time to give Liverpool a 2–1 aggregate lead before Diego Forlán scored to put the Spanish side through.

Chelsea

Benayoun signed for Chelsea on 2 July 2010, agreeing on a three-year deal, and keeping him with the Stamford Bridge club until summer 2013. Both clubs agreed on a fee of reported £5.5 million for the transfer of the Israeli winger's services. He said, in a statement to the club's official website, "I am very excited to come to a club like Chelsea, it is a big club and I think it is a dream for every player. Hopefully we will be successful."

Benayoun made his debut against Eintracht Frankfurt in a pre-season friendly before making his first competitive appearance on 8 August in a 3–1 loss against Manchester United in the 2010 FA Community Shield, by coming on for left-winger Florent Malouda in the 72nd minute. On 21 August, Benayoun scored his first league goal in the 93rd minute for Chelsea in a 6–0 thrashing of Wigan Athletic at the DW Stadium in Wigan, Greater Manchester.
On 22 September, Benayoun ruptured his achilles during Chelsea's 4–3 League Cup loss against Newcastle United. Benayoun fully recovered from this injury and was played in the second half against Wigan Athletic on 9 April 2011.

On 26 August 2011, Benayoun offered Juan Mata his number 10 shirt. Benayoun said: "I decided to give Mata the number 10 – his favourite. For me it's just a number, not my lucky 15." (Florent Malouda wore number 15 at the time.) Mata wore the shirt for Valencia and while skippering Spain's Under 21s in the summer and expressed his gratitude to Benayoun. "It is a very important number to me so I'm pleased to be wearing it. I want to thank Yossi," he said.

During the 2011 Tour of Asia, in the friendly game against the Malaysia XI team, Benayoun suffered repeated booing from the Malaysian crowd each time he touched the ball. It was reported that "The occasion was soured by the repeated jeering of Israel midfielder Benayoun by the 85,000-strong crowd ..." another source reported that "Muslim-majority Malaysia is a staunch supporter of the Palestinians and has no diplomatic ties with Israel. The midfielder was jeered throughout his appearance for the first half of the friendly."

Arsenal (loan)

On 31 August 2011, it was confirmed Benayoun had joined Arsenal on a one-year loan deal as he found chances at Chelsea limited. He made his debut on 10 September 2011 coming on as a second-half substitute for Andrei Arshavin against Swansea City. On 20 September 2011, he scored his first goal for Arsenal in the 78th minute of a League Cup match against Shrewsbury Town.

Benayoun scored his first UEFA Champions League goal for Arsenal in a 3–1 defeat to Olympiacos. He scored his first Premier League goal for Arsenal against Aston Villa, scoring an 87th-minute header in a 2–1 victory on 21 December 2011.

Benayoun captained Arsenal in their 1–0 League Cup defeat to Manchester City. He stated "The truth is I did not expect this, but it was a nice moment. When the line-up was revealed at the hotel, I saw the letter 'C' next to my name; I thought there was some mix up. But overall it was a nice experience"

Benayoun started the match against Tottenham Hotspur on 26 February 2012. He came off in the 88th minute for Gervinho, receiving a standing ovation from the Arsenal faithful with the Gunners winning the match 5–2, after being 2–0 down. He then started against his old club Liverpool, on 3 March 2012, before being substituted in the 74th minute again for Gervinho, Arsenal went on to win the game 2–1. He then started the match against Manchester City on 8 April 2012, and nearly had a chance to score in the second half, but only to see his stabbing shot take a deflection, which then came off the post. He was substituted in the second half for Aaron Ramsey, and just like in the match against Tottenham, the Arsenal fans gave him a standing ovation when leaving the pitch. Arsenal went on to win the game 1–0, thanks to a late Mikel Arteta goal. On 11 April 2012 he scored his second league goal of the season in the 3–0 away win against Wolves, a result which strengthened Arsenal's place in third as they opened up a gap of five points over arch-rival Tottenham Hotspur and Newcastle United with five games remaining. He then opened the scoring against Norwich in Arsenal's final home game of the season which ended 3–3 and then scoring in the last game of the season for Arsenal against West Bromwich Albion at the Hawthorns, the match ended 3–2 to Arsenal, meaning Arsenal would finish third, beating their North London rivals Tottenham Hotspur, who finished fourth. In all, Benayoun played 19 league games for Arsenal, scoring four goals.

West Ham United (loan)
On 31 August 2012, Benayoun returned to West Ham United on loan for the 2012–13 season, becoming their eleventh signing of the transfer window. He sustained an injury playing against Newcastle United in November and pulled a ligament after returning to training. He played no further games for West Ham and returned to Chelsea in December 2012. He had played only six games on loan with West Ham.

Queens Park Rangers
Benayoun joined Queens Park Rangers until the end of the 2013–14 season on 10 December 2013. He made his debut against Leicester City in a 1–0 loss in a league match coming as a 69th-minute substitute for Tom Carroll. He scored his first goal for the club on 22 March 2014 in an away trip to Middlesbrough to equalise in a game which QPR went on to win 1–3. He scored his second goal for the club three days later in a 1–0 home win over Wigan Athletic, though he was also sent off towards the very end of the game for a second bookable offence.

Maccabi Haifa
On 6 June 2014, it was officially announced that Benayoun would return to Maccabi Haifa on a two-year deal worth US$1 million.
 He was appointed the team's captain, replacing veteran Yaniv Katan who retired from football. In his two seasons, Maccabi Haifa did not do well in the Israeli Premier League, with Benayoun scoring five and six goals respectively, but did win the Israel State Cup after 18 years. Benayoun had some confrontations with the fans, and after he and Haifa won the cup, he announced he was leaving Haifa and joining longtime rivals Maccabi Tel Aviv.

Maccabi Tel Aviv
Benayoun played one season in Maccabi Tel Aviv, scoring only one league goal and failing to win any title.

Beitar Jerusalem
In the beginning of the 2017–18 season Benayoun signed for Beitar Jerusalem. He started well, scoring three league goals with Beitar ranking among the league's leaders, before losing his place in the first squad in January and playing very little. As a result, he left Beitar and signed for Maccabi Petah Tikva. After a short spell with Maccabi Petah Tikva, he returned to Beitar Jerusalem in 2019.

Retirement
In April 2019, Benayoun announced his retirement from football.

International career
Benayoun was a member of the Israel U16 team that came third in the 1996 UEFA European Under-16 Championship.

He made his senior debut for the Israel national team against Portugal in a friendly on 18 November 1998 that resulted in a 2–0 away loss. Benayoun scored his first international hat-trick in a UEFA Euro 2000 qualifier against San Marino at Ramat Gan Stadium on 8 September 1999. The match finished as an 8–0 win for Israel.

During the 2006 FIFA World Cup qualifiers, Benayoun became the leading player of the Israel national team after equalizing against Cyprus at home (in a game that ended 2–1 to Israel) and scoring twice against Switzerland. In the away game in Cyprus, He assisted the winning goal after Nir Davidovich saved a crucial goal. His strong performances gave Israel a chance at qualifying for the World Cup, but they missed out on goal difference.

Just prior to the UEFA Euro 2008 qualifiers, Benayoun was given the captaincy of the Israeli national team. In eight appearances in the qualifiers, Benayoun has scored two goals. On 2 September 2010, Benayoun scored his second international hat-trick against Malta in a 3–1 win. Benayoun is Israel's most capped player of all time with 102 caps, and their joint third top scorer with 24 international goals.

Career statistics

Club

International
Scores and results list Israel's goal tally first, score column indicates score after each Benayoun goal.

Honours
Maccabi Haifa
Israeli Premier League: 2000–01, 2001–02
Israel State Cup: 2015–16

West Ham United
FA Cup runner-up: 2005–06

Chelsea
UEFA Europa League: 2012–13

Individual
Israeli Footballer of the Year: 2000–01

See also

List of men's footballers with 100 or more international caps
List of UEFA Champions League hat-tricks
List of Premier League hat-tricks
List of La Liga hat-tricks
List of Jewish footballers
List of Jews in sports

References

External links

 
 Yossi Benayoun international fames and goals (updated to 14 Feb 2011) at RSSSF.com
 
 Yossi Benayoun at BBC Sport
 maccabi-haifafc.walla.co.il
 one.co.il
 

1980 births
Living people
Israeli Sephardi Jews
Jewish footballers
Israeli footballers
Association football midfielders
Hapoel Be'er Sheva F.C. players
Maccabi Haifa F.C. players
Racing de Santander players
West Ham United F.C. players
Liverpool F.C. players
Chelsea F.C. players
Arsenal F.C. players
Queens Park Rangers F.C. players
Maccabi Tel Aviv F.C. players
Beitar Jerusalem F.C. players
Maccabi Petah Tikva F.C. players
Liga Leumit players
Israeli Premier League players
La Liga players
Premier League players
English Football League players
UEFA Europa League winning players
Israel under-21 international footballers
Israel international footballers
FIFA Century Club
Israeli expatriate footballers
Expatriate footballers in the Netherlands
Expatriate footballers in Spain
Expatriate footballers in England
Israeli expatriate sportspeople in the Netherlands
Israeli expatriate sportspeople in Spain
Israeli expatriate sportspeople in England
Footballers from Dimona
Israeli people of Moroccan-Jewish descent
Israeli Mizrahi Jews
FA Cup Final players
Israeli Footballer of the Year recipients